Van der Pol (also "Van de Pol", "Van de Poll", "Van den Pol" or "Van Pol") is a Dutch, toponymic surname, originally meaning "from the raised land". Notable people with the surname include:

Van der Pol(l) / Vanderpol
Alfred Vanderpol (1854–1915), French engineer, philanthropist and author
Anneliese van der Pol (born 1984), Dutch-born American actress and singer
Balthasar van der Pol (1889–1959), Dutch physicist
a.o. known for the Van der Pol oscillator and the Bonhoeffer-van der Pol model
Jaap van der Poll (1914–2010), Dutch javelin thrower
Jos van der Pol (born 1961), Dutch conceptual and installation artist
Liesbeth van der Pol (born 1959), Dutch architect
Van de Pol
 (1907–1996), Dutch billiards player
Van den Pol
Anthony van den Pol (born 1949?), Yale Professor of Neurosurgery
Van Pol
Christiaan van Pol (1752–1813), Dutch flower painter
Thijs van Pol (born 1991), Dutch football forward
Vera van Pol (born 1993), Dutch artistic gymnast

See also
10443 van der Pol, main-belt asteroid named after Balthasar van der Pol
Pol (disambiguation)
, Dutch noble family
Jacob R. H. Neervoort van de Poll (1862–1924), Dutch entomologist

References

Dutch-language surnames
Surnames of Dutch origin
Dutch toponymic surnames